Mormon Island as a place name may refer to the following places :

 Mormon Island, California, a ghost town in Sacramento County
 Mormon Island, Los Angeles, an island in San Pedro Bay